Stone Pushing Uphill Man is the 13th studio album by Paul Gilbert, released on August 5, 2014. The album features instrumental covers of songs by Aerosmith, James Brown, and more.

Track listing

Personnel
 Paul Gilbert – guitar, bass, bongos, composer, engineer, producer, vocals 
 Kenny Aronoff – drums
 Mike Portnoy - drums (tracks 1, 5)  
 Chase Bryant - bass (acoustic)
 Kris Persson - percussion
 Rick Estrin - dialogue (Track 6)

Production
 Jerry Guidroz - engineer
 James Ingram - mixing 
 Paul Logus - mastering
 Philip Naslund - engineer, producer
 Jay Ruston - mixing 
 Nathan Elliot Staley - engineer 
 Ben Dewey - illustrations 
 Jeannie Deva - vocal harmony 
 Brad Bond - sleeve design

References

External links
Stone Pushing Uphill Man
Stone Pushing Uphill Man - Paul Gilbert | Songs, Reviews, Credits | AllMusic
Paul Gilbert talks Stone Pushing Uphill Man track-by-track

Paul Gilbert albums
2014 albums
Shrapnel Records albums